Francis Newton Gifford (August 16, 1930 – August 9, 2015) was an American football player, actor, and television sports commentator. After a 12-year playing career as a halfback and flanker for the New York Giants of the National Football League (NFL), he was a play-by-play announcer and commentator for 27 years on ABC's Monday Night Football.

Gifford won the NFL Most Valuable Player Award from United Press International in 1956, the same season his team won the NFL Championship. During his career, he participated in five league championship games and was named to eight Pro Bowls. He was inducted into the Pro Football Hall of Fame in 1977. After retiring as a player Gifford was an Emmy Award-winning sportscaster, known for his work on ABC's Monday Night Football, Wide World of Sports, and the Olympics. He was married to television host Kathie Lee Gifford from 1986 until his death.

Early life 
Gifford was born in Santa Monica, California, the son of Lola Mae (née Hawkins) and Weldon Gifford, an oil driller. He graduated from Kern County Union High School, later renamed Bakersfield High School.
Following Gifford's death in 2015, his wife Kathie Lee Gifford said that her late husband grew up in a poverty-stricken home and that he and his family sometimes ate dog food. She said they lived in 29 places before Gifford attended high school, because his father could not find work during the Depression. She also said that as a young child, the family attended church every week and Gifford "asked Jesus into his heart and that remained with him for the rest of his life".

College career 
Gifford was unable to gain an athletic scholarship to the University of Southern California (USC) because of his low grade point average in high school. As a result he played a season of football for Bakersfield Junior College. While at Bakersfield, he made the Junior College All-America team and earned the grades needed to enroll at USC. At USC, Gifford was named an All-American after rushing for 841 yards on 195 carries during his final season. While at USC he was a member of Phi Sigma Kappa fraternity. He graduated from USC in 1952.

NFL career 

Gifford spent his entire NFL career with the New York Giants, beginning in 1952, playing both offense and defense. He made eight Pro Bowl appearances and had five trips to the NFL Championship Game. Gifford's best season may have been 1956, when he won the league's Most Valuable Player Award and led the Giants to the NFL title over the Chicago Bears.

He lost 18 months in the prime of his career when he was tackled by Philadelphia Eagles linebacker Chuck Bednarik in what is widely considered the hardest defensive hit, or one of the hardest, in the history of the National Football League and is often referred to simply as The Hit. During a November 20, 1960 game against the Philadelphia Eagles, he was knocked out by Bednarik on a passing play, suffering a severe head injury that led him to retire from football in 1961. However, Gifford returned to the Giants in 1962, changing positions from running back to flanker (now a type of "wide receiver").

His Pro Bowl selections came at three positions — defensive back, running back, and flanker. He permanently retired following the 1964 season.

During his 12 seasons with the Giants (136 regular-season games) Gifford had 3,609 rushing yards and 34 touchdowns in 840 carries; he also had 367 receptions for 5,434 yards and 43 touchdowns. Gifford completed 29 of the 63 passes he threw for 823 yards and 14 touchdowns with 6 interceptions. The 14 touchdowns is the most among any non-quarterback in NFL history; the 6 interceptions is tied with Walter Payton for most thrown by a non-quarterback.

Gifford was inducted into the Pro Football Hall of Fame on July 30, 1977.

After his death, an autopsy on his brain revealed that he lived with Chronic Traumatic Encephalopathy (CTE), a disease closely related to repeated head trauma. As of September 18, 2015, 87 out of 91 former NFL players tested had been diagnosed with the disease.

Broadcasting career 
After his playing days ended, Gifford became a broadcaster for CBS, covering football, golf and basketball. When Monday Night Football was launched in 1970, ABC had originally planned to have Gifford in their broadcast booth, but he still had a year remaining on his contract with CBS. Instead Gifford recommended his friend Don Meredith who was hired. The following year, Gifford replaced Keith Jackson as Monday Night Footballs play-by-play announcer, and remained involved with the show for 27 of its next 28 years. His low-key delivery provided a perfect counterbalance to broadcast partners Meredith and Howard Cosell. In an era with only three television broadcast networks, the series became the longest-running prime-time sports program in television history, and developed into one of television's most valuable franchises.

Gifford was providing play-by-play in the waning moments of a 1980 Monday Night Football game between the New England Patriots and Miami Dolphins when he and Cosell learned of John Lennon's murder. Cosell initially balked at breaking the news live on air, but Gifford convinced him, saying, "You’ve got to. If you know it, we’ve got to do it. Don’t hang on it. It’s a tragic moment, and this is going to shake up the whole world".  Cosell then informed the national  audience of the tragedy.

On January 20, 1985, Gifford provided play-by-play for the first Super Bowl to be broadcast on ABC, Super Bowl XIX between the San Francisco 49ers and Miami Dolphins in Stanford, California. Gifford was joined in the booth by Don Meredith and Joe Theismann.

In 1986, Al Michaels took over play-by-play duties, and Gifford switched to a color commentator role. However, Gifford did play-by-play for the next several years (Gifford was joined by Lynn Swann and O. J. Simpson on color commentary in 1986 and by Dan Dierdorf for the rest of his run on Monday Night Football) whenever Michaels was covering post-season baseball games for the network.

Following his affair with airline flight attendant Suzen Johnson in 1997, Gifford was replaced in the broadcast booth by Boomer Esiason in 1998. That season he was reassigned to a nominal role for ABC's Monday night pregame show, but the program was cancelled after one season. Gifford was not offered a new role by the network. Gifford was also host of British TV network Channel 4's NFL coverage with British born former New England Patriots kicker John Smith in 1986, which included coverage of Super Bowl XXI.  Additionally, he narrated the official Super Bowl XLVIII highlight film for NFL Films, for which he had narrated the New York Giants' annual highlight films.

Gifford was also a reporter and commentator on other ABC sports programs, such as coverage of the Olympics (including the controversial men's basketball gold medal game between the United States and Soviet Union at the 1972 Summer Olympics in Munich, which Gifford called alongside Bill Russell), skiing and golf. He announced Evel Knievel's jumps for ABC's Wide World of Sports in the 1970s, including when Knievel failed to clear 13 buses at Wembley Stadium in 1975. Gifford also guest hosted Good Morning America on occasion, including once when he met his future wife Kathie Lee.

In 1977, Gifford won an Emmy Award for Outstanding Sports Personality. He was given the Pete Rozelle Radio-Television Award by the Pro Football Hall of Fame In 1995 for his NFL television work.

Monday Night Football paid tribute to Gifford on September 14, 2015, by having ESPN announcers Mike Tirico and Jon Gruden wear the gold jackets that Gifford helped make famous as a broadcaster.

 Acting roles 
Frank Gifford appeared as Ensign Cy Mount in the 1959 World War II submarine film drama Up Periscope, starring James Garner, Edmond O'Brien, Andra Martin, and Alan Hale Jr.

Gifford appeared as himself as a guest star on the NBC television series, Hazel, in the episode, "Hazel and the Halfback", which originally aired December 26, 1963. In the story, Gifford is interested in investing in a local bowling alley. In 1977, Gifford appeared as himself in the episode "The Shortest Yard" of the ABC sitcom The San Pedro Beach Bums. He also appeared as himself in a two-hour episode of The Six Million Dollar Man titled "The Bionic Boy" in the same year. In 1994, Gifford also appeared as himself in the Nickelodeon kids show called The Adventures of Pete & Pete as a customer for the boy's Dad's driving range. In season one episode 4 titled "Rangeboy", Gifford and his wife Kathie Lee appeared in the February 28, 1995, episode of the ABC sitcom Coach, titled "The Day I Met Frank Gifford", in which a character on the show plots to meet the former football star who will attend an event to receive an award.

Gifford also had an acting role in television commercials.

 Personal life 
Gifford married his college sweetheart, USC's homecoming queen Maxine Avis Ewart, on January 13, 1952, after she became pregnant while they were students at USC. They had three children, Jeff (b. 1952), Kyle and Victoria, and five grandchildren. Victoria Gifford married Michael LeMoyne Kennedy, son of Robert F. Kennedy. Frank Gifford was next married to fitness trainer Astrid Lindley from 1978 to 1986. His first two marriages ended in divorce. Gifford married television presenter and singer Kathie Lee Johnson, who was 23 years his junior, on October 18, 1986. The couple settled in Greenwich, Connecticut, with their son, Cody Newton Gifford and daughter, Cassidy Erin Gifford. Gifford and his third wife Kathie Lee shared the same birthday, August 16. The couple co-hosted ABC's coverage of the 1988 Winter Olympics in Calgary.

Gifford had an older sister and younger brother, Winona and Waine.
In 1997, the tabloid magazine Globe paid a woman named Suzen Johnson to meet, get to know, and lure Gifford into a New York City hotel room secretly equipped with videotape systems enabling the Globe to take and obtain photos of Gifford being seduced. They published photos and stories. ESPN reported that the tabloid paid Johnson $75,000 to lure Gifford to the room while The Atlantic said it was $125,000. National Enquirer editor Steve Coz observed, "There's a difference between reporting the news and creating the news ... [w]ithout The Globe, there would be no story here. I'm in the tabloid industry, and this is way over the top. It's downright cruel."

The former lawyer of Johnny Carson, Henry Bushkin, claimed that Gifford had an affair with Carson's second wife Joanne in 1970.

 Death 
On August 9, 2015, a week before his 85th birthday, Gifford died from natural causes at his Greenwich, Connecticut, home at the age of 84.

In November 2015, Gifford's family revealed that he had chronic traumatic encephalopathy (CTE). The family said, "After losing our beloved husband and father, Frank Gifford, we as a family made the difficult decision to have his brain studied in hopes of contributing to the advancement of medical research concerning the link between football and traumatic brain injury... We decided to disclose our loved one's condition to honor Frank's legacy of promoting player safety dating back to his involvement in the formation of the NFL Players Association in the 1950s."

 Awards and honors College 1951 All-American
 College Football Hall of Fame (class of 1975)
 University of Southern California Athletic Hall of Fame (inaugural class of 1994)NFL Eight-time Pro Bowl selection
 1956 NFL MVP (as recognized by UPI)
 1956 NFL Champion
 1959 Pro Bowl MVP
 No. 16 retired by the New York Giants
 Pro Football Hall of Fame (class of 1977)
 Honorary co-captain of Super Bowl XLVIIITelevision'''
 Two-time Emmy Award winner
 1977 – Outstanding Sports Personality
 1997 – Lifetime Achievement Award
 1995 Pete Rozelle Radio-Television Award
 Disney Legend (class of 2008)
 NSMA Hall of Fame (class of 2017)

 In literature 
Gifford is a character in Frederick Exley's novel A Fan's Notes. In the novel, Gifford becomes the narrator's hero while both are at USC. Subsequently, the narrator continues to be an intense fan of Gifford and his team, the New York Giants, during his NFL career.

 Selected books 
 Gifford, Frank; Richmond, Peter. (2008) The Glory Game: how the 1958 NFL championship changed football forever. New York : Harper. 
 Gifford, Frank; Waters, Harry. (1993) The Whole Ten Yards New York : Random House. 
 Gifford, Frank; Mangel, Charles. (1976) Gifford on courage''. New York : M. Evans; Philadelphia : distributed by Lippincott.

Filmography

Film

Television

See also 
 History of the New York Giants (1925–78)
 The Hit (Chuck Bednarik)

References

External links 

1930 births
2015 deaths
American football cornerbacks
American football players with chronic traumatic encephalopathy
American football running backs
American football wide receivers
American television sports announcers
Bakersfield Renegades football players
College football announcers
College Football Hall of Fame inductees
Eastern Conference Pro Bowl players
Golf writers and broadcasters
National Football League announcers
New York Giants announcers
New York Giants players
National Football League players with retired numbers
Olympic Games broadcasters
Pete Rozelle Radio-Television Award recipients
Players of American football from Santa Monica, California
Pro Football Hall of Fame inductees
Skiing announcers
Sports Emmy Award winners
United States Football League announcers
University of Southern California alumni
USC Trojans football players
Wide World of Sports (American TV series)